Unthanks Cave Natural Area Preserve is a  Natural Area Preserve in Lee County, Virginia.  It protects the entrance to Unthanks Cave, which houses significant biological diversity and a wide variety of invertebrate life. The cave's streams drain a significant karst area south of the Powell River.

A rare species of hydrobiid snail was first discovered in Unthanks Cave in 1986. Additional unusual species found within the cave include a second hydrobiid snail, the Powell Valley planarian (Sphalloplana consimilis), the Southwest Virginia cave isopod (Caecidotea recurvata), and a cave-dwelling carabid beetle.

The only known entrance to the  cave was purchased by The Nature Conservancy in 1987, and was the first cave system purchased in Virginia by the organization. The Nature Conservancy gave the property to the Virginia Department of Conservation and Recreation in 2004, although they continue to conduct research at the site.

Although previously popular with spelunkers due to the cave's large speleothems, Unthanks Cave is today gated and inaccessible except for official scientific monitoring and inquiry.

See also
 List of Virginia Natural Area Preserves

References

External links
Virginia Department of Conservation and Recreation: Unthanks Cave Natural Area Preserve

Virginia Natural Area Preserves
Protected areas of Lee County, Virginia
Protected areas established in 2004
Landforms of Lee County, Virginia
Caves of Virginia
2004 establishments in Virginia